The Battle of Silistra occurred in the spring of 968 near the Bulgarian town of Silistra, but most probably on the modern territory of Romania. It was fought between the armies of Bulgaria and Kievan Rus' and resulted in a Rus' victory. Upon the news of the defeat, the Bulgarian emperor Peter I abdicated. The invasion of the Rus' prince Sviatoslav was a heavy blow for the Bulgarian Empire, which by 971 lost its eastern provinces to the Byzantine Empire.

Origins of the conflict 

From the 940s the Magyars began repeatedly to launch pillage raids into the Bulgarian Empire. Emperor Peter I was unable to stop them and as the Byzantines were unwilling to send any help he finally allied with the Magyars and gave them safe passage through Bulgaria to attack Byzantine Thrace. In 968 the Byzantine emperor Nikephoros II Phokas paid the Kievan knyaz Sviatoslav Igorevich to attack Bulgaria in answer of the alliance between the Bulgarian emperor Peter I and the Magyars.

The battle 

Sviatoslav Igorevich gathered 60,000 troops and started his campaign in the early spring of 968. He met the Bulgarians, who were only 30,000 strong, near Silistra. The battle continued the whole day and until dark the Bulgarians seemed to have overwhelmed the Kievans, but, elated by Sviatoslav's personal example, the latter were victorious due to their still larger army. The Bulgarians retreated to the Silistra fortress and withstood the following siege.

Aftermath 

The Rus' forces continued their victorious campaign and though they failed to take Silistra, they seized 80 other fortresses. Sviatoslav Igorevich was eventually forced to return to Kiev after Bulgarian diplomacy inspired the Pechenegs to besiege his capital.

Sources 

Атанас Пейчев и колектив, 1300 години на стража, Военно издателство, София 1984.
Йордан Андреев, Милчо Лалков, Българските ханове и царе, Велико Търново, 1996.
Божидар Димитров, Българите-първите европейци, София, 2002.

Battles involving the First Bulgarian Empire
Silistra
History of Silistra
10th century in Bulgaria
10th century in Kievan Rus'
968
960s conflicts